Auriculastra duplicata is a species of air-breathing land snail, a terrestrial gastropod mollusc in the family Ellobiidae, the salt marsh snails.

Distribution 
This species occurs in Japan in Honshū, Kyūshū and Shikoku. It is considered to be a vulnerable species in Japan, in Okinawa Prefecture.

References

 Frias Martins, A. M. (1995). The anatomy of Auriculastra subula (Bquoy and Gaimard, 1832) (Pulmonata: Ellobiidae) from Hong Kong, with a comment on the systematic position of Auriculastra Martens, 1880. In: Morton B, editor. Asian Marine Biology 11.Hong Kong University Press, Hong Kong. 79-88
 Groh K. (2010). [in G. Poppe, ed.] Philippine marine mollusks, vol. 3: 446-457. Hackenheim: Conchbooks
 Lee H.-S. & Lee Y.-S. (2015). A report of three unrecorded ellobiid species (Gastropoda, Eupulmonata) from Korea. Korean Journal of Malacology. 31(4): 323-326
 Raven H. & Vermeulen J.J. (2007). Notes on molluscs from NW Borneo and Singapore. 2. A synopsis of the Ellobiidae (Gastropoda, Pulmonata). Vita Malacologica. 4: 29-6
 Lozouet P. & Plaziat J.C. (2008) Mangrove environments and molluscs. Abatan River, Bohol and Panglao Islands, central Philippines. Hackenheim: Conchbooks. 160 pp.

External links

Ellobiidae
Gastropods described in 1854